Ljiljana Paša-Tolić is a Croatian research scientist who is a research fellow in Functional and Systems Biology at the Pacific Northwest National Laboratory. She is responsible for developing capability in mass spectrometry at the PNNL Environmental Molecular Sciences Laboratory. Her research looks to develop analytical techniques to modify protein abundance.

Early life and education 
Paša-Tolić studied chemistry at the University of Zagreb. She remained in Zagreb for graduate research, specializing in physical organic chemistry. She moved to the National High Magnetic Field Laboratory as a visiting researcher, where she developed a fourier-transform ion cyclotron resonance spectrometer to study biopolymers. She moved to the PNNL as a postdoctoral fellow in 1995.

Research and career 
Paša-Tolić is an expert in mass spectrometry and the development of analytical methods to understand molecular processes. She developed sophisticated modalities of mass spectrometry to investigate the polymerases found in plants. Her research showed that the polymerases found in arabidopsis are actually derivatives of a polymerase found in eukaryotes.

Paša-Tolić was included in the 2021 Analytical Sciences Power List.

Selected publications

References 

Living people
University of Zagreb alumni
Croatian emigrants to the United States
20th-century American scientists
21st-century American scientists
20th-century American women scientists
21st-century American women scientists